Oloron Cathedral, now St. Mary's Church, is a Roman Catholic church and former cathedral located in the town of Oloron-Sainte-Marie, in the Pyrénées-Atlantiques département of France. It is in the Romanesque and Gothic architectural traditions.

Construction was started in the 12th century by Gaston IV, Viscount of Béarn. It was the seat of the Bishopric of Oloron, suppressed by the Concordat of 1801.

It has been listed as a monument historique by the French Ministry of Culture since March 1939, and was named a World Heritage Site by UNESCO in 1998.

References

External links

 3D Virtual Visit 
 Location
 Notre Dame Oloron in Circulo Romanico

Former cathedrals in France
Churches in Pyrénées-Atlantiques
World Heritage Sites in France